Michael Louis Allen (born January 31, 1959) is an American professional golfer, currently on the PGA Tour Champions.

Early life and amateur career
Allen was born in San Mateo, California and played college golf at the University of Nevada in Reno.

Professional career
Allen turned professional in 1984 and played on the European Tour 1986-89 and 1992, winning the 1989 Scottish Open. Allen played on the PGA Tour 1990-95, 2002, and 2004-09. He has played over 300 events on the PGA Tour and has three second-place finishes (2004 Chrysler Classic of Greensboro, 2007 Turning Stone Resort Championship and 2010 Viking Classic) and three third-place finishes, but no wins. He played on the Nationwide Tour from 1997-2001 and 2003, winning the Nike Greater Austin Open in 1998.

Allen received a special invitation to play at the Senior PGA Championship on the Champions Tour at the Canterbury Golf Club in Beachwood, Ohio because of his career earnings on the PGA Tour. He was a surprise winner of the event in his Champions Tour debut making his first win a major. He shot a first round of 4-over-par, but made only 3 bogeys in the final 3 rounds to win by 2 strokes over Larry Mize and 3 strokes over Bruce Fleisher.

A member of the Olympic Club in San Francisco since age 14, Allen qualified for the U.S. Open in 2012 at age 53. At the previous Opens at Olympic in 1987 and 1998, he had failed to make the field.

Professional wins (11)

European Tour wins (1)

Nike Tour wins (1)

Other wins (1)
2003 Southern Arizona Open

PGA Tour Champions wins (8)

PGA Tour Champions playoff record (2–2)

Results in major championships

Note: Allen never played in the Masters Tournament.

CUT = missed the half-way cut
DQ = Disqualified
"T" = tied

Results in The Players Championship

CUT = missed the half-way cut
"T" = tied

Senior major championships

Wins (1)

Results timeline
Results are not in chronological order before 2022.

CUT = missed the halfway cut
WD = withdrew
"T" indicates a tie for a place
NT = No tournament due to COVID-19 pandemic

See also
1989 PGA Tour Qualifying School graduates
1990 PGA Tour Qualifying School graduates
1991 PGA Tour Qualifying School graduates
1992 PGA Tour Qualifying School graduates
1994 PGA Tour Qualifying School graduates
2001 PGA Tour Qualifying School graduates
2003 PGA Tour Qualifying School graduates
2005 PGA Tour Qualifying School graduates
2006 PGA Tour Qualifying School graduates

References

External links

American male golfers
Nevada Wolf Pack men's golfers
PGA Tour golfers
European Tour golfers
PGA Tour Champions golfers
Winners of senior major golf championships
Golfers from California
Golfers from Scottsdale, Arizona
People from San Mateo, California
1959 births
Living people